The Surati or Surti is an Indian breed of goat, from the state of Maharashtra.

References

Goat breeds
Goat breeds originating in India
Fauna of Maharashtra
Animal husbandry in Maharashtra
Surat